Cómo Nace El Universo (How the Universe is Born) is the sixth studio album released by Mexican singer Gloria Trevi. Trevi resumed her musical career with this album, which was produced by Armando Ávila and published in November 2004.  It is her first release after the singer got out of jail in September 2004, where she was for almost five years. In addition, this is her first album not to be produced by her long-time collaborator  and it is a follow-up to her album Si Me Llevas Contigo, which was released nine years earlier.

The themes in the album include women empowerment, fame, money, death, freedom, politics, press sensationalism, loyalty and love. All of the songs were composed by Trevi both in jail and also during the time before she was arrested. During the early stages of the recording of this album, Trevi had to collaborate with her record producer through a phone in Chihuahua's prison, singing to him the material she created in her cell. She received Gold and Platinum certifications in the United States as well as a nomination for best Latin pop album for Billboard magazine. The first single En Medio De La Tempestad (Amidst the tempest) received moderate success on radio. This song was composed by Trevi around 2001 while she was captive in Brasilia, and she performed early versions of it in several TV interviews behind bars. It was dedicated to the fans that kept on supporting her after her imprisonment. The music video for "En Medio de la Tempestad" also received moderate success on TV, although the song eventually became a fan-favorite. The album received mixed to positive reviews in spite of the fact that Trevi's image had been heavily damaged by the media and the scandals in previous years. El Domador (The tamer) and Eres Un Santo (You're a saint) did not achieve the expected success due to the merger of BMG with Sony Music Entertainment, in which promotion was affected.

The song "Timbres Postales Al Cielo" was composed by Trevi in Brazil's jail in 2000 was dedicated to her deceased first-born daughter Ana Dalay, who died being 33-days old and whose body was disposed of by Andrade in a river in Brazil. She sang snippets of the song in several TV interviews for different countries, including a British documentary about the "Trevi-Andrade clan", and she always ended up crying. The song "Nieve de Mamey" was dedicated to one of Trevi's cellmates and her also convicted husband in Chihuahua's jail. Furthermore, "Eres Un Santo" was dedicated to Gloria Trevi's boyfriend Armando Gómez, whom she met in Chihuahua's prison. On the other hand, Trevi performed an early version of the song "Cómo Nace el Universo" in 1998 in a TV interview before being arrested, in which she stated that her supposed "new" album was ready to be released. The song "Poder Y Fama" is based on a 1991 song called "Rondas Infantiles" by Miguel Pizarro, which was produced by Andrade. A song called "Policromías de Delfín", which was dedicated to her son Ángel Gabriel who was born was she was under arrest, was performed by Trevi in several TV interviews in and out of prison and it was expected to be included in the album, but it remains unreleased.

Trevi promoted the album by performing in a number of TV shows in different countries between 2004 and 2005. Also, she embarked on a tour called "Trevolution Tour" to promote the album, which at some point in 2005 had to be canceled due to Trevi's pregnancy. Trevi's image during this era was more mature and refined in comparison to her previous looks and outfits.

Track listing

Sales and certifications

References

Gloria Trevi albums
2004 albums